Arthur Leong may refer to:

Arthur Leong (judge) (1936–2010), Hong Kong judge
Arthur Leong (footballer), New Zealand footballer